Rebekah Graf  is an American film and television actress. She is best known for playing Heather Locklear in the 2018 biopic The Dirt.

Family and early life 
Graf was born and raised in Corpus Christi, Texas.  From an early age she aspired to be an actress, and began performing in local theater at the age of five or six years old, a goal fostered by her parents.  Graf attended Ray High School and the University of Texas at Austin where she majored in theater arts.

Career 
Graf relocated from Austin to Los Angeles and began auditioning for TV and film parts. Early roles included small parts in TV series 90210 and the Comedy Central series Workaholics.  She also acted in the films Savage County; the 2015 continuation film of the series Entourage; and The Amityville Murders, the true story of the mass murder antecedent to the alleged supernatural events of The Amityville Horror.

In 2018, Graf was cast in the Netflix biopic The Dirt, as 80s TV star Heather Locklear, then-wife of Mötley Crüe drummer Tommy Lee.  The Dirt received mixed reviews from the critics but was one of the top audience-rated films of 2019 on Rotten Tomatoes.
Graf's subsequent roles have included a lead in the film Capsized: Blood in the Water, a survival film based on the true story of a yacht crew stranded in shark-infested waters; and a guest role on highly regarded Netflix dramatic comedy series The Kominsky Method.

In 2021, Graf was cast in The CW series Walker starring Jared Padalecki, a reboot of the 1993–2001 television series Walker, Texas Ranger, as Crystal. She had been cast in a recurring role as Tara Locke, the mother of Kyle Abbott's (Michael Mealor) son on the CBS soap opera The Young and the Restless, but had to be replaced due to a resulting scheduling conflict with Walker's shooting.

Personal life 
In 2019, the tabloid press linked Graf with the actor Josh Duhamel.

References

External links 
 

21st-century American actresses
People from Corpus Christi, Texas
American film actresses
American television actresses
Living people
University of Texas at Austin College of Fine Arts alumni
Actresses from Texas
American expatriate actresses in the United Kingdom
Year of birth missing (living people)